An independent voter, often also called an unaffiliated voter or non-affiliated voter in the United States, is a voter who does not align themselves with a political party. An independent is variously defined as a voter who votes for candidates on issues rather than on the basis of a political ideology or partisanship; a voter who does not have long-standing loyalty to, or identification with, a political party; a voter who does not usually vote for the same political party from election to election; or a voter who self-describes as an independent.

Voting systems outside of the United States, including the British parliamentary system, may include independent voters as being "floater voters" or swing votes.

Definition
The earliest concept of independents is of a person whose political choices, by definition, were made based on issues and candidates (due to lack of party affiliation). Furthermore, early studies of voting behavior conclusively demonstrated that self-identified independent voters are less interested in specific elections than partisan voters, poorly informed about issues and candidates, and less active politically. However, a contrary view emerged: The independent usually voted on the basis of deeply ingrained beliefs, attitudes and loyalties, and is more like the strongly partisan voter than any other voter (or the idealized "independent").

By the 1960s, scholars attempted to define the independent based on behavior, rather than party identification or loyalty. Focusing on ticket splitters, these studies depicted an independent voter who had the same level of political interest as strong partisans and who voted largely based on the issues with which they strongly agreed or disagreed. However, by focusing on voting behavior, this definition of the independent ignored non-voters. Critics claimed that the independent voter is merely a subset of the larger set of independents, which should also include non-voters. Studies also found that voting and not-voting is deeply affected by the particular candidate running in an election. Voting, therefore, is more reflective of what candidate is running—and therefore a poor measure of partisanship.

More recently, scholars focused on self-identification as a good measure of a person's political independence. The value of self-identification as a measure of a person's political independence or partisanship is that it is seen as a proxy for the behavior which should be exhibited by the independent voter. Additionally, self-identification could be easily captured either with a nominal question ("Do you self-identify with an existing political party?", a question which is answered with a "yes" or a "no"), or by a structured ordinal question ("Generally speaking, do you consider yourself a Democrat, a Republican, an independent, or what?"). The first analyses of this measure of political independence found that there were significant differences between those individuals who self-identified as "independent" and those who listed "no preference" as to party identification. Individuals who expressed "no preference" usually exhibited low levels of interest in politics, low levels of knowledge about the candidates and issues, low frequency of voting, and less confidence in their ability to influence politics.

Although some scholars continue to conclude that self-description is the best measure of partisanship or independence, a number of studies have found debilitating problems with this measure. The nature of the voter registration system and the appearance of the ballot, the way the question reinforces a unidimensional interpretation of the political arena, the measure's failure to function in a multi-party political system, the measure's confusion of the theoretical relationship between partisanship and the intent to vote, question wording errors which confuse a social group with a political party, failure to predict policy (versus candidate) preferences, question order, and failure to measure partisanship accurately when there are sizeable differences in party size all confound accurate measurement of partisanship and independence using this measure. Even the nature of a survey instrument as a measure of partisanship and independence has been called into question.

Terminology
There are several synonyms for the term independent voter:
 In the U.S. state of Florida, a registered voter who chooses not to affiliate with a political party is termed no party affiliation (NPA).
 In the U.S. state of Massachusetts, a registered voter who chooses not to enroll in a political party or designation is termed unenrolled.
 In the U.S. state of Oregon, a registered voter who chooses not to affiliate with a political party is termed a non-affiliated voter (NAV).

Partisan influence
To many scholars, independence seemed the flip-side of partisanship. Identifying the variables which are significant in creating partisanship would, therefore, identify the variables which are significant in creating political independence. Subsequently, a very large body of scholarship has emerged which has attempted to analyze partisanship.

Parents appear to be a primary source of political socialization and partisanship. Much of the theoretical basis for this hypothesis emerged from the fields of child psychology and social learning, which studied the ways in which children are socialized and values inculcated in them. Studies of political partisanship have found that partisanship is strongest when both parents have the same political loyalties, these loyalties are strong, both parents have similarly strong party loyalties, and parental partisanship accords with socio-economic status (for example, the wealthy are Republicans or the poor are Labour supporters).

Social groups are another source of partisanship. Friends, relatives, and neighbors often have the same partisan loyalties and strengths as one's parents. The more homogeneous the social group, the more likely the individual will be to develop strong partisan loyalties. When social group homogeneousness is low, the individual is likely to be less strongly socialized into partisan politics and more likely to seek a different party loyalty (whether by disengaging from partisanship or switching partisan loyalties).

Life-cycle and generational effects also contribute to partisanship. Initially, studies indicated that the operative variable was the "life-cycle." That is, a person's partisan attachments naturally grew stronger over time as weak socialization became strong and strong socialization became stronger. Additionally, theorists suggested that older voters favored certain policy preferences (such as strong government pensions and old-age health insurance) which led them to (strongly) favor one party over another. Later studies showed that the initial strong effect of the life-cycle variable was mitigated by generational effects. Party identification seemed strongly affected by certain formative generational events (such as the Civil War, the Great Depression or the social upheaval of the 1960s). Several studies concluded that generational effects were distinct from life-cycle effects, and that both factors were significant in creating (or not) partisanship.

But if generational events affected partisanship, some scholars hypothesized that lesser political, social, and economic issues might as well. Conceding that major "shocks" such as the Great Depression could realign or dealing partisanship, some scholars reasoned that a series of smaller shocks over time could also dramatically influence the direction and strength of partisanship. Many scholars became convinced that partisanship was not bedrock but shifting sand. Important childhood events (such as becoming aware of a presidential campaign) as well as events in adulthood (such as recessions, war, or shifting racial policies) could also affect the level of partisanship. The concept of "retrospective voting"—in which the voter makes political judgments based on the party-in-power's performance over the past few years—deeply influenced studies of partisanship. Applying the concept of retrospectiveness to partisanship, more recent analyses have concluded that retrospective and prospective political party success play a significant role in the direction and strength of partisanship.

Both repeated "minor shocks" and retrospective/prospective assessments of political party success are micro-level, rather than macro-level, variables. That is, while very important in creating political independence, they affect individuals only. For example, John may come to believe that Party A is no longer effective and become an independent. Yet, Mary may come to the conclusion that Party A is still effective. Both voters see the same successes and failures, but their retrospective and prospective calculus of success varies.

This has led some scholars to conclude that independence is not the flip-side of partisanship. Rather, partisanship and political independence may be two distinct variables, each of which must be measured separately and using different theoretical constructs. Other scholars have concluded that the causal direction of partisanship must be questioned. While it has long been assumed that partisanship and the strength of partisanship drive attitudes on issues, these scholars conclude that the causal relationship is reversed.

Increase of independent voters

In the United States
Using the self-identification method of measuring political independence, surveys found an increasing number of independent voters beginning in 1966. In 1952, when modern polling on the issue began, the number of independent voters nationwide was 22 percent. By 1976, the number had risen more than half, to 36 percent of the electorate. Regionally, the rise of the independent voter was even more apparent. In the non-Deep South, the number of independent voters had risen from 22 percent to 37 percent. But in the Deep South, the number of independents rose steeply from 14 percent in 1952 to 32 percent in 1976 (and would rise even further, to 35 percent, by 1984).

Gallup polls data shows independent leaning voters represent the majority of American voters a trend since 2004.

Although the number of self-identified independents has fallen slightly in the 1990s and 2000s, about 30 percent of American voters still say they are independents (as measured by self-identification).

Several analyses conclude that (whether through survey error or misconceptualization of the nature of political independence) the number of independent voters has remained relatively unchanged in the United States since the 1950s.

Reasons
In the United States, voter identification as an independent varies widely across regions as well as states. Inter-party competition, the organizational strength of each party, electoral variables (such as the ease of voter registration, voting procedures, the timing of primaries and elections, etc.), and even turnout seem to greatly affect the number of independents in a state. The effect of these variables is not uniform across all the states, either.

In Europe 
In the British parliamentary system, a similar concept of a "floating voter" is used to describe voters who can change their voting alignment and freedom from political parties. This term may also be applied in referendum votes, such as in the vote for "Brexit".

Dutch politics also uses the term floating voter to describe party non-affiliation.

In Iran 
There is a large swing vote in Iran, known as "Party of the Wind", or "grey vote", which can be rapidly excited.

Impact
Because independent voters do not have strong affectional ties to political parties, scholars who adhere to the self-identification method for measuring political independence theorize that independents may be more susceptible to the appeals of third-party candidates. It has also been suggested that the more independent voters, the more volatile elections and the political system will be. Others hypothesize that the amount of ticket-splitting will increase, leading to greater parity between the strongest political parties, an increase in the number of minor political parties (particularly "down-ballot" in state, county or local races), or possibly even a breakdown in the political party system.

Scholars who hold to the behavioral measure of determining political independence point out that there has been little change in the level of ticket-splitting since the initial upsurge in the 1950s. They also posit that, when independents who strongly lean toward one party are included in the same group as that party's strong partisans, there has also been little change in party loyalty since the 1950s. For example, partisan Republicans and independents who lean Republican tend to vote for Republican candidates just as frequently in the 1990s as they did in the 1950s. In the United States, the tendency of both strong and weak partisans to vote a straight ticket in down-ballot races is even stronger than it is for presidential and congressional races.

Many scholars also say that partisanship is only one of many variables which predict voting choice. A decline in partisanship may have little to no impact on election outcomes, and much depends on fluctuations in these other factors.

Realigning elections
For more than half a century, the concept of a realigning election—a dramatic shift in the electoral coalition supporting the existing political system—has been an important one in political theory. First enunciated by V. O. Key, Jr. in 1955, the theory of realigning elections suggested that certain "critical elections" created sudden, massive shifts in the electorate. The political party and policies of the status quo were changed, and a new governing coalition installed which would rule for decades until the next critical election. The theory of critical elections fit well with what scholars knew about generational effects and the emerging literature on "major shocks" as a variable in determining the existence, direction, and strength of partisanship. It also helped explain the radical shifts in national politics which occurred irregularly in American history. Scholars also hypothesized that realigning elections rejuvenated public support for the political system, which helped explain the relative stability of American political structures. In time, scholars refined the theory somewhat. The concept of "secular realignment" was developed to account for gradual shifts in politics which had similar effects (eventually) to a critical realigning election. Some studies concluded that "secular realignment" came in short, jerky, periods called "punctuations." Initially, the concept of a realigning election was monolithic, that is, the effects were believed to be national in effect. But beginning in the 1980s, political scientists began to conclude that realigning elections could occur on sub-national levels (such as regions or even within states).

But with the "rise of the independent voter" and no realigning election, scholars developed the theory of the "dealigning election." In the dealigning election, all political parties lose support as partisanship decreases and political independence rises. Split-ticket voting and issue-oriented voting increase, leading to political volatility. Divided government (one party controls the executive branch, while another controls the legislature) becomes the norm.

A number of scholars have dismissed the theory of realignment and dealignment, however. They argue that the concept is vague and the data do not support mass change in electoral behavior. The large number of qualifications which must be made to the theory of critical elections has rendered it useless, it is argued. The theory of secular realignment has been particularly criticized. The replacement of elderly voters (who die) with a new generation of voters (who come of age and are eligible to vote) is normal, not a unique and irregular "punctuation" or "surge," it is claimed. Still other scholars claim there are no regional dealignment variations while others argue that the concept of realignment and dealignment is no longer useful in an era in which political parties are no longer very important in the political system.

Impact of dealignment
Scholars argue that political parties play a critical supportive role in democracies. Parties regulate the type and number of people seeking election, mobilize voters and enhance turnout, and provide the coalition-building structure essential for office-holders to govern. Parties also serve as critical reference groups for voters, framing issues and providing and filtering information. These functions, it is claimed cannot otherwise be accomplished, and democracies collapse without them. Only political parties serve these roles.

Dealignment—the rise in the number of independent voters—has an extremely deleterious effect on democracy, these scholars claim. Dealignment leads to the rise of candidate-centered elections in which parties and ideologies play little part. Without parties, candidates rely ever-more heavily on mass media for communication, political action committees (PACs) for funds, special interest groups for staff, and political consultants for expertise. The increasing reliance on mass communication leads to a withering of political discourse as the sound bite and an emphasis on the horse-race aspect of politics becomes the norm. This limits the amount and kind of information the public receives, leading to less choice for voters. When voters can stay at home and watch television rather than participate in civic life, the public no longer perceives the need to become involved in democracy—and so the civic life of the democracy withers. As PACs and interest groups become more important, the number of people speaking to the public, providing political information and different political choices and views, declines. Additionally, PAC and interest group spokespeople may not be representative of the public or the groups they claim to speak for, creating disenfranchisement of various (often minority) groups. As independent voting and ticket-splitting rise, parties seek to insulate themselves from the whipsaw effect of elections. The power of incumbency becomes increasingly important, and accessibility by the public declines. Parties seek increasingly moderate positions in order to stay electorally viable, further limiting political choice ("both parties look and sound the same"). As the parties distance themselves from the average voter and seem to offer limited policy options, dealignment worsens. As ideology plays less and less a part in elections, it becomes more and more difficult for parties to forge coalitions of like-minded officeholders. Governmental deadlock becomes common, further encouraging independent voting as citizens perceive "their" party to be ineffective. As ticket-splitting rises, divided government becomes the norm, making it even more difficult for office-holders to enact and implement policies. Politics becomes increasingly volatile, with first one party and then another governing. Although parties once held politicians accountable for their actions, their increasing irrelevance in politics leads to a decline in accountability (and thus even less responsiveness and less democracy). The "Imperial Presidency" becomes more important, since single officeholders with great power become the only politicians capable of governing.

Other scholars have concluded that dealignment has not harmed democracy. Political parties have adapted to the realities of large numbers of independent voters, it is argued. The candidate-centered election has actually revitalized parties, and led to new party structures and behaviors which have allowed parties to survive in the age of mass communication. A minority view, however, suggests that the evidence for a resurgence of political parties too equivocal, and that scholars lack the theoretical concepts to make such judgments.

Yet another strain of thought has concluded that "realignment" is occurring. The slow "secular realignment" is not yet over, these scholars say. Regional differences in the level and impact of dealignment simply point up the fact that major shifts in political coalitions are occurring. Slowly but surely, these studies conclude, realignment is happening and will be obvious within a generation. These scholars argue that the surge in independent voters which began in the 1960s has ended, and that there are distinct signs that partisanship is on the rise again.

See also
Centrism
Independent politician
Independent Democrat
Independent Republican (disambiguation)
Radical center (politics)
Swing vote

Notes

References

Abramowitz, Alan I. and Saunders, Kyle L. "Ideological Realignment in the U.S. Electorate." Journal of Politics. August 1998.
Abramson, Paul R. "Developing Party Identification: A Further Examination of Life-Cycle, Generational, and Period Effects." American Journal of Political Science. February 1979.
Abramson, Paul R. "Generational Change and the Decline of Party Identification in America: 1952-1974." American Political Science Review. June 1976.
Abramson, Paul R.; Aldrich, John H.; and Rohde, David W. Change and Continuity in the 2004 Elections. Paperback ed. Washington, D.C.: Congressional Quarterly Press, 2005. 
Achen, Christopher H. "Parental Socialization and Rational Party Identification." Journal of Political Behavior.June 2002.
Aldrich, John H. Why Parties?: The Origin and Transformation of Political Parties in America. Paperback ed. Chicago: University of Chicago Press, 1995. 
Allsop, Dee and Weisberg, Herbert F. "Measuring Change in Party Identification in an Election Campaign." American Journal of Political Science. November 1988.
Alvarez, R. Michael. "The Puzzle of Party Identification: Dimensionality of an Important Concept." American Politics Research. October 1990.
Ambinder, Marc. "A Nation of Free Agents." Washington Post. September 3, 2006.
Backstrom, Charles H. and Hursh-César, Gerald. Survey Research. 2nd ed. New York: John Wiley and Sons, 1981. 
Bandura, Albert. Social Learning Theory. Englewood Cliffs, N.J.: Prentice-Hall, 1977. 
Bartle, John. "Improving the Measurement of Party Identification in Britain." In British Elections & Parties Review. Philip Cowley, David Denver, Justin Fisher and Andrew Russell, eds. London: Routledge, 1999. 
Beck, Paul Allen. "Partisan Dealignment in the Postwar South." American Political Science Review. June 1977.
Beck, Paul Allen and Jennings, M. Kent. "Family Traditions, Political Periods, and the Development of Partisan Orientations." Journal of Politics. August 1991.
Beck, Paul Allen and Jennings, M. Kent. "Parents As 'Middlepersons' in Political Socialization." Journal of Politics. February 1975.
Berry, Jeffrey M. and Wilcox, Clyde. The Interest Group Society. 4th ed. New York: Longman, 2006. 
Billingsley, Keith R. and Tucker, Clyde. "Generations, Status and Party Identification: A Theory of Operant Conditioning." Journal Political Behavior. December 1987.
Bishop, George F.; Tuchfarber, Alfred J.; and Oldendick, Robert W. "Change in the Structure of American Political Attitudes: The Nagging Question of Question Wording." American Journal of Political Science. May 1978.
Brody, Richard and Page, Benjamin I. "Comment: Assessment of Policy Voting." American Political Science Review. June 1972.
Brody, Richard A. and Rothenberg, Lawrence S. "The Instability of Partisanship: An Analysis of the 1980 Presidential Election." British Journal of Political Science. October 1988.
Buckley, Kara Z. Parties and Elections in America: The Electoral Process. 4th ed. Lanham, Md.: Rowman & Littlefield, 2004. 
Bullock III, Charles S.; Hoffman, Donna R.; and Gaddie, Ronald Keith. "Regional Variations in the Realignment of American Politics, 1944-2004." Social Science Quarterly. September 2006.
Burnham, Walter Dean. Critical Elections and the Mainsprings of American Politics. Paperback ed. New York: W.W. Norton & Company, 1971. 
Campbell, Angus; Converse, Phillip E.; Miller, Warren E.; and Stokes, Donald E. The American Voter. New York: Wiley and Sons, 1960.
Campbell, David E. "The Young and the Realigning: A Test of the Socialization Theory of Realignment." Public Opinion Quarterly. Summer 2002.
Campbell, James E. "Party Systems and Realignments in the United States, 1868-2004." Social Science History. Fall 2006.
Campbell, James E. "The Revised Theory of Surge and Decline." American Journal of Political Science. November 1987.
Carmines, Edward G.; McIver, John P.; and Stimson, James A. "Unrealized Partisanship: A Theory of Dealignment." Journal of Politics. May 1987.
Carmines, Edward G. and Stimson, James A. "Issue Evolution, Population Replacement, and Normal Partisan Change." American Political Science Review. March 1981.
Carsey, Thomas M. and Layman, Geoffrey C. "Changing Sides or Changing Minds? Party Identification and Policy Preferences in the American Electorate." American Journal of Political Science. April 2006.
Cassel, Carol A. "A Test of Converse's Theory of Party Support." Journal of Politics. August 1993.
Chaffee, Steven H.; McLeod, Jack M.; and Wackman, Daniel B. "Family Communication Patterns and Adolescent Participation." In Socialization to Politics: A Reader. Jack Dennis, ed. New York: Wiley. 1973. 
Chubb, John E. and Peterson, Paul E. "Realignment and Institutionalization." In New Directions in American Politics. John E. Chubb and Paul E. Peterson, eds. Washington, D.C.: Brookings Institution, 1985. 
Claggett, William. "Partisan Acquisition vs. Partisan Intensity: Life-Cycle, Generational, and Period Effects." American Journal of Political Science. 1981.
Clarke, Harold D. and Kornberg, Allan. "Support for the Canadian Progressive Conservative Party Since 1988: The Impact of Economic Evaluations and Economic Issues." Canadian Journal of Political Science. March 1992.
Clarke, Harold D. and Suzuki, Motoshi. "Partisan Dealignment and the Dynamics of Independence in the American Electorate, 1953-88." British Journal of Political Science. January 1994.
Clubb, Jerome M.; Flanigan, William H.; and Zingale, Nancy H. Partisan Realignment: Voters, Parties, and Government in American History. Rev. ed. Boulder, Colo.: Westview Press, 1990. 
Converse, Philip E. The Dynamics of Party Support. Beverly Hills, Calif.: SAGE Publications, 1976. 
 
Cowden, Jonathan A. "Southernization of the Nation and Nationalization of the South: Racial Conservatism, Social Welfare and White Partisans in the United States, 1956-92." British Journal of Political Science. April 2001.
Dalton, Russell J.; McAllister, Ian; and Wattenberg, Martin P. "The Consequences of Partisan Dealignment." Parties Without Partisans. New York: Oxford University Press, 2001. 
Dennis, Jack. "Political Independence in America, Part I: On Being an Independent Partisan Supporter." British Journal of Political Science. January 1988.
DeVries, Walter and Tarrance, Lance. The Ticket Splitter. Grand Rapids, Mich.: Eerdmans, 1972.
Eldersveld, Samuel J. and Walton, Hanes. Political Parties in American Society. 2d ed. New York: Palgrave Macmillan, 2000. 
Finkel, Steven E. and Opp, Karl-Dieter. "Party Identification and Participation in Collective Political Action." Journal of Politics. May 1991.
Finkel, Steven E. and Scarrow, Howard A. "Party Identification and Party Enrollment: The Difference and the Consequences." Journal of Politics. June 1985.
Fiorina, Morris. Divided Government. Rev. ed. New York: Macmillan, 1992. 
Fiorina, Morris. "Parties and Partisanship: A 40-Year Retrospective." Journal of Political Behavior. June 2002.
Fiorina, Morris P. Retrospective Voting in American National Elections. New Haven, Conn.: Yale University Press, 1981. 
Flanigan, William H. and Zingale, Nancy H. Political Behavior of the American Electorate. 6th ed. Dubuque, Iowa: William C. Brown Publishers, 1988. 
Franklin, Charles H. and Jackson, John E. "The Dynamics of Party Identification." American Political Science Review. December 1983.
Giles, Michael W. and Hertz, Kaenan. "Racial Threat and Partisan Identification." American Political Science Review. June 1994.
Goldberg, Arthur S. "Social Determinism and Rationality As Bases of Party Identification." American Political Science Review. March 1969.
Green, Donald; Palmquist, Bradley; and Schickler, Eric. Partisan Hearts and Minds. Paperback ed. New Haven, Conn.: Yale University Press, 2004. 
Green, Donald Philip. "On the Dimensionality of Public Sentiment Toward Partisan and Ideological Groups." American Journal of Political Science. August 1988.
Green, John C. and Coffey, Daniel J. The State of the Parties: The Changing Role of Contemporary American Parties. 5th ed. Lanham, Md.: Rowman & Littlefield, 2006. 
Green, John C. and Herrnson, Paul S. Responsible Partisanship?: The Evolution of American Political Parties Since 1950. Paperback ed. Lawrence, Kan.: University Press of Kansas, 2003. 
Greene, Steven. "Understanding Party Identification: A Social Identity Approach." Political Psychology. June 1999.
Hart, Roderick P. Campaign Talk. Princeton, N.J.: Princeton University Press, 2000. 
Hart, Roderick P. Seducing America: How Television Charms the Modern Voter. Rev. ed. Beverly Hills, Calif.: SAGE Publications, 1998. 
Heath, Anthony and Pierce, Roy. "It Was Party Identification All Along: Question Order Effects on Reports of Party Identification in Britain." Electoral Studies. June 1992.
Hershey, Marjorie. Party Politics in America. 12th ed. New York: Pearson Longman, 2007. 
Hess, Robert D. and Torney, Judith V. The Development of Political Attitudes in Children. Chicago: Aldine, 1967.
Hetherington, Marc J. and Keefe, William J. Parties, Politics, and Public Policy in America. 10th ed. Washington, D.C.: Congressional Quarterly Press, 2006. 
Holbert, R. Lance. "Television News Viewing, Governmental Scope, and Postmaterialist Spending: Assessing Mediation By Partisanship." Journal of Broadcasting & Electronic Media. December 2005.
Huckfeldt, Robert; Levine, Jeffrey; Morgan, William; and Sprague, John. "Accessibility and the Political Utility of Partisan and Ideological Orientations." American Journal of Political Science. July 1999.
Huddy, Leonie. "From Social to Political Identity: A Critical Examination of Social Identity Theory." Political Psychology. March 2001.
Jacoby, William G. "The Impact of Party Identification on Issue Attitudes." American Journal of Political Science. August 1988.
Jennings, M. Kent and Markus, Gregory B. "Partisan Orientations over the Long Haul: Results from the Three-Wave Political Socialization Panel Study." American Political Science Review. December 1984.
Johnston, Richard. "Party Identification Measures in the Anglo-American Democracies: A National Survey Experiment." American Journal of Political Science. May 1992.
Kamieniecki, Sheldon. Party Identification, Political Behavior, and the American Electorate. Westport, Conn.: Greenwood Press, 1985. 
Keith, Bruce E.; Magleby, David B.; Nelson, Candice J.; Orr, Elizabeth; Westlye, Mark C.; and Wolfinger, Raymond E. The Myth of the Independent Voter. Berkeley, Calif.: University of California Press, 1992. 
Key Jr., V.O. The Responsible Electorate. Cambridge, Massachusetts: Harvard University Press, 1966.
Key, Jr., V.O. "Secular Realignment and the Party System." Journal of Politics. May 1959.
Key, Jr., V.O. "A Theory of Critical Elections." Journal of Politics. February 1955.
King, Anthony. The New American Political System. 2nd ed. Washington, D.C.: AEI Press, 1990. 
Knoke, David and Hout, Michael. "Social and Demographic Factors in American Political Party Affiliations, 1952-72." American Sociological Review. October 1974.
Ladd, Everett Carll "Like Waiting for Godot: The Uselessness of 'Realignment' for Understanding Change in Contemporary American Politics." In The End of Realignment? Interpreting American Electoral Eras. Byron E. Shafer, ed. Madison, Wisc.: University of Wisconsin Press, 1991. 
Ladd, Carll Everett. "The 1994 Congressional Elections: The Postindustrial Realignment Continues." Political Science Quarterly. Spring 1995.
Ladd, Everett C. and Hadley, Charles D. "Party Definition and Party Differentiation." Public Opinion Quarterly. Spring 1973.
Lawrence, David G. "On the Resurgence of Party Identification in the 1990s." In American Political Parties: Decline or Resurgence? Jeffrey E. Cohen, Richard Fleisher, and Paul Kantor, eds. Washington, D.C.: Congressional Quarterly Press, 2001. 
Levine, Myron. Presidential Campaigns and Elections: Issues and Images in the Media Age. 2d ed. Itasca, Ill.: F.E. Peacock Publishers, 1995. 
Lilleker, Darren. Key Concepts in Political Communication. Paperback ed. Beverly Hills, Calif.: Sage Publications, 2006. 
Lockerbie, Brad. "Change in Party Identification: The Role of Prospective Economic Evaluations." American Politics Research. July 1989.
Lockerbie, Brad. "Party Identification: Constancy and Change." American Politics Research. December 2002.
Mackay, David. Essentials of American Politics. Boulder, Colo.: Westview Press, 1999. 
Maisel, Louis Sandy, ed. The Parties Respond: Changes in American Parties and Campaigns. 4th ed. Boulder, Colo.: Westview Press, 2002. 
Mayhew, David R. Electoral Realignments. Paperback ed. New Haven, Conn.: Yale University Press, 2004. 
McAllister, Ian and Watternberg, Martin P. "Measuring Levels of Party Identification: Does Question Order Matter?" Public Opinion Quarterly. Summer 1995.
McSweeney, Dean and Zvesper, John. American Political Parties. New York: Routledge, 1991. 
Miller, Warren E. "Party identification, Realignment, and Party Voting: Back to the Basics." American Political Science Review. June 1991.
Miller, Arthur H. and Wattenberg, Martin P. "Measuring Party Identification: Independent or No Partisan Preference?" American Journal of Political Science. February 1983.
Nardulli, Peter F. "The Concept of a Critical Realignment, Electoral Behavior, and Political Change." American Political Science Review. March 1995.
Niemi, Richard G. and M. Kent Jennings. "Issues and Inheritance in the Formation of Party Identification." American Journal of Political Science. November 1991.
Norpoth, Helmut and Rusk, Jerrold G. "Electoral Myth and Reality: Realignments in American Politics." Electoral Studies. June 2007.
Norpoth, Helmut and Rusk, Jerrold G. "Partisan Dealignment in the American Electorate: Itemizing the Deductions Since 1964." American Political Science Review. September 1982.
Norrander, Barbara. "Explaining Cross-State Variation in Independent Identification." American Journal of Political Science. May 1989.
Page, Benjamin I. and Jones, Calvin C. "Reciprocal Effects of Policy Preferences, Party Loyalties and the Vote." American Political Science Review. December 1979.
Paulson, Arthur. Realignment and Party Revival: Understanding American Electoral Politics at the Turn of the Twenty-First Century. New York: Praeger Publishers, 2000. 
Petrocik, John R. "An Analysis of Intransitivities in the Index of Party Identification." Political Methodology. Summer 1974.
Pomper, Gerald. "The Classification of Presidential Elections." Journal of Politics. August 1967.
Pomper, Gerald. Voter's Choice: Varieties of American Electoral Behavior. Rev ed. Lanham, Md.: University Press of America, 1983. 
Pomper, Gerald. Voters, Elections and Parties: The Practice of Democratic Theory. Paperback ed. New Brunswick, N.J.: Transaction Publishers, 1988. 
Prior, Markus. Post-Broadcast Democracy: How Media Choice Increases Inequality in Political Involvement and Polarizes Elections. New York: Cambridge University Press, 2007. 
Putnam, Robert. Bowling Alone: The Collapse and Revival of American Community. Paperback ed. New York: Simon & Schuster, 2001. 
Putz, David W. "Partisan Conversion in the 1990s: Ideological Realignment Meets Measurement Theory." Journal of Politics. November 2002.
Reichley, A. James. The Life of the Parties. Paperback ed. Lanham, Md.: Rowman & Littlefield, 2000. 
Rosenof, Theodore. Realignment: The Theory that Changed the Way We Think About American Politics. Paperback ed. New York: Rowman & Littlefield Publishers, Inc., 2003. 
Sabato, Larry J. and Larson, Bruce. The Party's Just Begun: Shaping Political Parties for America's Future. 2nd ed. New York: Longman, 2001. 
Sears, David O. and Valentino, Nicholas A. "Politics Matters: Political Events as Catalysts for Preadult Socialization." American Political Science Review. March 1997.
Shea, Daniel M. "The Passing of Realignment and the Advent of the 'Base-less' Party System." American Politics Research. March 1999.
Shively, W. Phillips. "The Development of Party Identification Among Adults: Exploration of a Functional Model." American Political Science Review. December 1979.
Sinclair, Barbara. Party Wars: Polarization and the Politics of National Policy Making. Paperback ed. Stillwater, Okla.: University of Oklahoma Press, 2006. 
Smith, Steven S. Party Influence in Congress. Paperback ed. New York: Cambridge University Press, 2007. 
Sorauf, Frank J. and Beck, Paul Allen. Party Politics in America. 6th ed. Glenview, Ill.: Scott, Foresman and Co., 1988. 
Sundquist, James L. Dynamics of the Party System: Alignment and Realignment of Political Parties in the United States. Rev. ed. Washington, D.C.: Brookings Institution Press, 1983. 
Thurber, James A. and Nelson, Candice J., eds. Campaigns and Elections American Style. 2d ed. Boulder, Colo.: Westview Press, 2004. 
Tubbesing, Carl D. "Predicting the Present: Realigning Elections and Redistributive Policies." Polity. Summer 1975.
Valentino, Nicholas, and Sears, David O.. "Event-Driven Political Socialization and the Preadult Socialization of Partisanship." Political Behavior. July 1998.
Wattenberg, Martin P. The Decline of American Political Parties, 1952-1996. Cambridge, Massachusetts: Harvard University Press, 1998. 
Wattenberg, Martin P. The Rise of Candidate-Centered Politics: Presidential Elections of the 1980s. Cambridge, Massachusetts: Harvard University Press, 1991. 
Weakliem, David and Heath, Anthony. "Regional Differences in Class Dealignment: A Comment on Johnston and Pattie." Political Geography. November 1995.
Wolfinger, Raymond E. "The Promising Adolescence of Campaign Surveys." In Campaigns and Elections American Style. James A. Thurber and Candice J. Nelson, eds. Boulder, Colo.: Westview Press, 1995. 
Wong, J.S. "The Effects of Age and Political Exposure on the Development of Party Identification Among Asian American and Latino Immigrants in the United States." Political Behavior. December 2000.

External links
 Independent Voters of America
 IndependentVoice.org
 Independent Voting.Org
 Independent Voter Network

Political terminology of the United States
Voting theory